The Raška District is one of eight administrative districts of Šumadija and Western Serbia. It expands to the south-western part of the country. As of 2022 census, the district has a population of 299,664 inhabitants. The administrative center of the Raška district is Kraljevo.

Municipalities
The district encompasses the municipalities of:
 Kraljevo
 Vrnjačka Banja
 Raška
 Novi Pazar
 Tutin

Demographics

According to the census results from 2011, the Raška District has 309,258 inhabitants. 53.2% of the population lives in the urban areas. Ethnic composition of the district: As of 2022 census, the district has a population of 299,664 inhabitants.

Ethnic groups

Society and culture

Culture
At the outskirts of Kraljevo stands the Žiča monastery. This spiritual center of the Serbian medieval state was built around 1220, to become also the center of newly founded Serbian Arch-episcopacy.

The Studenica monastery was built in the late twelfth century, as the endowment of the Serb ruler Stefan Nemanja, who endowed it richly with the icons and books. After he had become a monk and left for Serbian Hilandar on the Mt. Athos, his older son Stefan, later named the "First-Crowned", took his place in taking care over the monastery. In the vicinity of Novi Pazar stands the Sopoćani monastery, built around 1260 as the endowment of King Stefan Uros I, the son of King Stephen the First-Crowned. The primary and major value of the Sopoćani monastery are its frescoes, by which it ranks among the best examples of the European medieval painting.

Education
There are three universities located in the Raška District:
Public
 State University of Novi Pazar, founded in 2006
 University of Kragujevac - there are two faculties of the university that are located in the municipalities of Kraljevo and Vrnjačka Banja
Faculty of Mechanical and Civil Engineering in Kraljevo
Faculty of Hotel Management and Tourism in Vrnjačka Banja

Private
 International University of Novi Pazar, founded in 2002

See also 
 Administrative divisions of Serbia
 Districts of Serbia

References 

Note: All official material made by Government of Serbia is public by law.

External links

 

 
Districts of Šumadija and Western Serbia